Krasang railway station is a railway station located in Krasang Subdistrict, Krasang District, Buriram Province.

References 

Railway stations in Thailand
Buriram province